Liselotte Funcke (20 July 19181 August 2012) was a German liberal politician of the Free Democratic Party (FDP). She was a member of the German Bundestag parliament from 1961 to 1979, serving as its vice president from 1969. She then was appointed state Minister of Economy in North Rhine-Westphalia, the first woman in the position. Funcke is remembered for her engagements to integrate foreigners in German society, as the Federal Commissioner for Foreigners (Ausländerbeauftragte) from 1981 to 1991, and afterwards.

Life 

Funcke was born in Hagen to a liberal-leaning family, the fourth child of a factory owner. Her father was member of the board and president of the Reichsverbandes der Deutschen Industrie from 1919 to 1933, and became a member of the Bundestag for the FDP in the 1950s. Her mother came from the Osthaus family of bankers. She attended the Realgymnasium, where she achieved the Abitur in 1937. She served in the Arbeitsdienst and attended the Kaufmannsschule Dortmund. She then studied Betriebswirtschaftslehre (business administration) in Berlin, where she earned her diploma in 1941. Funcke worked for three years for a Wirtschaftsprüfer (statutory auditor) in Wuppertal; from 1944 she was responsible for balance, taxes, and finance in the company Schraubenfabrik und Gesenkeschmiede Funcke & Hueck, which her great-grandfather had founded in Hagen.

Funcke's political career began after World War II, joining the FDP in 1946. She was a member of the Landtag of North Rhine-Westphalia state parliament from 1950 to 1961, when she was elected to the German Bundestag. Funcke was the parliament's vice-president from 1969 to 1979. From 1972 to 1979 she was chairman of the Bundestag's Finance Committee, having already been its deputy chairman from 1965 to 1969.

Funcke served as state  (Wirtschaft, Mittelstand und Verkehr) in North Rhine-Westphalia from 1979, the first woman in the position. She had to leave the post a year later because her party was no longer part of the Landtag. She understood the position as "interpreter" of the problems of the foreigners, especially the large group of Turkish workers who brought their families with them; it earned her the respectful name Mutter der Türken (Mother of the Turks), and she continued to serve their interests in public after her official term.

Funcke died in Hagen at the age of 94.

Publications

Awards 

 1973: Order of Merit of the Federal Republic of Germany
 1975: 
 1975: Grand Cross of the Order of Merit of the Federal Republic of Germany

 1984: Theodor Heuss Medal

 1985: Grand Cross of the Spanish Order of Civil Merit
 1986: Order of Merit of North Rhine-Westphalia
 1987: Grand Cross of the Order of Merit (Portugal)
 1988: Grand Officer's Cross of the Order of Merit of the Italian Republic
 1988: Order of the Yugoslav Star with Golden Wreath
 1990: Fritz Bauer Prize of the Humanist Union

 1991: 

 1999: Honorary doctorate of the Fernuniversität Hagen
 2003: Alfred-Müller-Felsenburg-Preis für aufrechte Literatur

References

Further reading

External links 

 
 
 Liselotte Funcke vollendet das 90. Lebensjahr (in German) hagen-58.de 18 July 2008

1918 births
2012 deaths
Members of the Bundestag for North Rhine-Westphalia
Members of the Bundestag 1976–1980
Members of the Bundestag 1972–1976
Members of the Bundestag 1969–1972
Members of the Bundestag 1965–1969
Members of the Bundestag 1961–1965
Female members of the Bundestag
20th-century German women politicians
Members of the Bundestag for the Free Democratic Party (Germany)
Members of the Landtag of North Rhine-Westphalia
Grand Crosses with Star and Sash of the Order of Merit of the Federal Republic of Germany
Reich Labour Service members